The 2010 IBAF Intercontinental Cup was an international baseball competition, held in Taichung, at the Taichung Intercontinental Baseball Stadium, and Douliu, at the Douliu Baseball Stadium, Taiwan from October 23 to 31, 2010.

Teams
The following 10 teams confirmed their appearance.

Round 1

Pool A

Standings

Schedule

Pool B

Standings

Schedule

Round 2

Pool C

Standings

Schedule

Semifinals 8th-10th

Round 3

Finals

9th-10th place Final

7th-8th place Final

5th-6th place Final

Bronze Medal

Gold Medal

Final standings

Awards
The IBAF announced the following awards at the completion of the tournament.

See also
 List of sporting events in Taiwan

References

External links
2010 Intercontinental Cup on IBAF.org 
Cuban Team Stats

Intercontinental Cup
2010
Intercontinental Cup (baseball)
2010 in Taiwanese sport
Sport in Taichung
October 2010 sports events in Asia